Texas A&M University School of Public Health, formerly known as the Texas A&M Health Science Center School of Rural Public Health, is a public health research, service and training program. It was founded in 1998 and offering degrees at undergraduate and graduate levels.  2019 rankings of US grad schools, U.S. News & World Report ranked it 28th in healthcare management, 37th in public health, and 53rd in pharmacy.

SPH was selected by the U.S. Army Medical Department Center and School to provide training to military personnel in the Department of Preventive Health Services Principles in the Army Preventive Medicine program, a collaborative graduate program at Ft. Sam Houston in San Antonio.

References

External links 

Official website

1998 establishments in Texas
Educational institutions established in 1998
Public Health
Schools of public health in the United States
Texas AandM Health Science Center School of Public Health
Medical and health organizations based in Texas